St Ann's Hospital is a mixed healthcare campus in South Tottenham in the London Borough of Haringey, England, and is the headquarters for Barnet, Enfield and Haringey Mental Health NHS Trust. It also formerly housed the Haringey NHS primary care trust.

History
The Metropolitan Asylums Board purchased the site where St Ann's Hospital now stands in August 1892. The hospital, which was initially known as the North Eastern Fever Hospital and treated patients suffering from fever and diphtheria, opened in October 1892. Building work on the administration block began in 1898 and construction of the laundry began the following year.

The Metropolitan Asylum Board was liquidated in 1929 and the hospital came under the administration of London County Council in 1930. The hospital joined the National Health Service in 1948 under the management of the Tottenham Hospital Management Committee, part of the North East Metropolitan Regional Hospital Board. The hospital was renamed St Ann's General Hospital in 1951. It came under the responsibility of Haringey Health Authority in 1982 and transferred to the management of Barnet, Enfield and Haringey Mental Health NHS Trust in 2001.

See also
 Healthcare in London
 List of hospitals in England

References

External links
 Barnet, Enfield & Haringey Mental Health Trust

NHS hospitals in London
Health in the London Borough of Haringey
Health in the London Borough of Enfield
Health in the London Borough of Barnet